The National Bank of the Republic of North Macedonia (NBRSM) is the central bank of North Macedonia, located in the capital city, Skopje.

Since 22 May 2018, Anita Angelovska Bezhoska is Governor of NBRNM. Prior to the name change in 2019, the National Bank of the Republic of North Macedonia was known as The National Bank of the Republic of Macedonia.

Functions

The NBRNM performs the following functions:

establish and conduct monetary policy;
regulate liquidity in the international payments;
establish and conduct the Denar;
handle and manage foreign exchange reserves;
regulate the payment system;
grant founding and operating license to a bank and a savings house and supervise the banks and savings houses;
grant a licence for performing services of prompt money transfer and supervise the operations of the entities performing services of prompt money transfer in accordance with a law;
grant operating licenses to foreign exchange bureaus and supervise their operations in accordance with the law;
issue banknotes and coins;
perform activities for the account of the central government and the government administration bodies.

Governors

Borko Stanoevski, 1986-1997
Ljube Trpeski, 1997-2004
Petar Goshev, 2004-2011
Dimitar Bogov, May 2011 - May 2018
Anita Angelovska Bezhoska, May 2018 -

See also
Economy of Europe
Economy of North Macedonia
List of banks in North Macedonia
List of central banks
Macedonian denar

References

External links
 

North Macedonia
Economy of North Macedonia
1990s establishments in the Republic of Macedonia
Banks established in the 1990s
Banks established in 1946
Companies based in Skopje
Macedonian companies established in 1993
Banks established in 1993